Monte San Biagio is a mountain of Basilicata, southern Italy.

Mountains of Basilicata